Education Town (Punjabi, Taleempur) is a housing estate located within union council 117 (Hanjarwal) in Iqbal Tehsil of Lahore, Punjab, Pakistan.

References

Samanabad Zone